Zachary "Zach" Svajda (born November 29, 2002) is an American professional tennis player. He achieved a career-high ATP singles ranking of world No. 226 on 27 February 2023 and he peaked at No. 664 in doubles on 8 August 2022.

Early life and background
A native of San Diego, California, Svajda took up tennis at the age of 2, initially coached by Matt Hanlin. 

He has taken a fairly unique path towards becoming a professional tennis player.  He has not followed traditional tennis development steps such as competing in junior tournaments, joining a tennis academy, or playing in college within NCAA leagues.  Instead, he has followed his own independent path that included having a college tennis player living with his family and practicing with him as early as when he was eight years old.

Even currently, he does not follow a regular tennis circuit.  He will play in a Challenger level tournament only to skip several following Challenger tournaments.  As the opportunity arises he may enter on an ad hoc basis an ATP tournament as a wildcard.   

He earned his first ATP World Tour ranking point at the age of 15, defeating top-seeded João Lucas Reis da Silva of Brazil 6–3, 6–4 at the 2018 Claremont Club Pro Classic as a local main-draw wild card.

Professional career

2019: ATP and Grand Slam debut
On August 11, 2019, Svajda defeated Govind Nanda 6–7(3–7), 7–5, 6–3, 6–1 to win the USTA Boys 18s National Championship. This victory earned the 16-year-old a wild card into the main draw of the 2019 US Open, making him the youngest player to play in the men's US Open since Donald Young in 2005. There, despite succumbing to full-body cramps in a five-set first round loss to Paolo Lorenzi, he drew attention as a future prospect in American professional tennis for his solid ground strokes and adept net play.

2021: First Major win at the US Open
After defeating Ben Shelton 6–1, 6–4, 6–1 to defend his Boys 18s National Championship title, Svajda was given another wildcard into the US Open. There, ranked world No. 716, he beat world No. 81 Marco Cecchinato to progress to the second round before bowing out against 13th seed Jannik Sinner in four tight sets. The latter was an unexpectedly close match between two young players with a differential in ranking of over 700 spots.

2022: Maiden Challenger title
He won his maiden title at the 2022 Tiburon Challenger defeating compatriot Ben Shelton. As a result he climbed to a career-high No. 255 on 10 October 2022.

2023: Top 250 debut

Tennis style and temperament 
He is right-handed with a two-handed backhand like the vast majority of professional tennis players.  By today's standards, he is much shorter than the average tennis professional.  His game is not grounded with a formidable serve like many of his counterparts.  Instead, he has developed an all around game including a very proficient defense and counter punching game.  His backhand is very strong.  In some positions on the court, it can be even stronger than his forehand.  This makes him handle left-handers' games much more easily than your usual right-hander.  His strong backhand also allows him to withstand any forceful attacking shots struck by taller players.  

Unlike the majority of professional tennis players, he shows virtually no emotion on the court.  He seems to have mastered the mental game aspect of tennis at an unusually young age.  In interviews, he is often asked about his temperamental predisposition.  And, he answers that it is just part of his nature.  He has always behaved the same way on a tennis court since the very beginning.

ATP Challenger and ITF Futures finals

Singles: 4 (4–0)

References

External links
 
 
 

Living people
2002 births
American male tennis players
People from La Jolla, San Diego
Tennis players from San Diego

es:Zachary Svajda#top